The 1997 Ontario municipal elections were led in all municipalities across the Canadian province of Ontario on November 10, 1997, to elect mayors and reeves, councillors, and school trustees. There were also referendum questions in some municipalities.

The most closely watched contest was in the newly amalgamated city of Toronto, where Mel Lastman narrowly defeated Barbara Hall to win the mayoralty. In other results, Hazel McCallion was re-elected in Mississauga, Bob Morrow was returned in Hamilton, and Dianne Haskett was elected in London.

Elected mayors
Ajax: Steve Parish 
Barrie: Janice Laking
Brampton: Peter Robertson
Brantford: Chris Friel (details) 
Burlington: Robert MacIsaac
Cambridge: Jane Brewer
Chatham-Kent: Bill Erickson
Clarington: Diane Hamre
Cornwall: Brian Sylvester
Gloucester: Claudette Cain (details)
Guelph: Joe Young (details)
Halton Hills: Marilyn Serjeantson
Hamilton: Bob Morrow (details)
Kanata: Merle Nicholds (details)
Kingston: Gary Bennett 
Kitchener: Carl Zehr 
London: Dianne Haskett 
Markham: Don Cousens
Mississauga: Hazel McCallion 
Nepean: Mary Pitt (details)
Newmarket: Tom Taylor
Niagara Falls: Wayne Thomson 
North Bay: Jack Burrows
Oakville: Ann Mulvale  
Oshawa: Nancy Diamond 
Ottawa: Jim Watson (details)
Peterborough: Sylvia Sutherland 
Pickering: Wayne Arthurs
Richmond Hill: Bill Bell
Sarnia: Mike Bradley  
Sault Ste. Marie: Steve Butland 
St. Catharines: Tim Rigby (details) 
Stoney Creek: Anne Bain 
Sudbury: Jim Gordon (details)
Thunder Bay: Ken Boshcoff 
Timmins: Vic Power
Toronto: Mel Lastman (details)
Vaughan: Lorna Jackson  
Waterloo: Joan McKinnon
Welland: Dick Reuter 
Whitby: Marcel Brunelle
Windsor: Mike Hurst (details)

Elected regional chairs
Hamilton–Wentworth: Terry Cooke
Ottawa–Carleton: Bob Chiarelli (details)
Sudbury: Peter Wong
Waterloo: Ken Seiling

Results

Lakefield

Source: Bill Hodgins, "Battle on for Lakefield pair," Peterborough Examiner, 6 November 2000, B3.

References

 
November 1997 events in Canada